Gaggle is a student surveillance software primarily used in American K-12 school districts. It has been criticized for its over-surveillance of students and alleged breaches of consent and privacy.

History 

Since May 2022, the Trevor Project listed Gaggle as a corporate partner from a $25,000 donation. In October, the Trevor Project said it would return the donation "[i]n light of concerns about Gaggle's software having a role in negatively impacting LGBTQ students".

References 

Computer surveillance
Stalkerware